Pedras Tinhosas is a small archipelago of two islets, Tinhosa Grande and Tinhosa Pequena, south-west of the island of Príncipe in the Atlantic Ocean. Since 2012, it has formed part of UNESCO's Island of Príncipe Biosphere Reserve, which includes the island of Príncipe and the surrounding islets.

Environment
Both islets are covered with brushwood, and serve as a nesting ground for a wide variety of sea birds, including Anous stolidus, Anous minutus, Onychoprion fuscatus, white-tailed tropic bird (Phaethon lepturus) and the brown booby (Sula leucogaster). The islets have been recognised as an Important Bird Area (IBA) by BirdLife International for their seabird colonies.

References

Uninhabited islands of São Tomé and Príncipe
Ramsar sites in São Tomé and Príncipe
Príncipe
Important Bird Areas of São Tomé and Príncipe
Seabird colonies